The R638 road is a regional road in northern County Cork, Ireland. It connects the R619 to the N20 south of Mallow.

References

Regional roads in the Republic of Ireland
Roads in County Cork